Ronchi dei Legionari is a comune (municipality) in the Province of Gorizia in Friuli-Venezia Giulia, Italy, about  southwest of Gorizia and  northwest of Trieste. It is the location of Trieste – Friuli Venezia Giulia Airport, the major commercial airport serving the region.

The comune was called Ronchi di Monfalcone up to 1925. It owes its current name to the Legionaries of Gabriele D'Annunzio, who set out from the town on 12 September 1919 (the so-called March of Ronchi), to start the Enterprise of Fiume.

According to the Italian census of 1971, 4% of the population was of Slovene ethnicity, while according to the Austrian census of 1910 only 1% of the population was slovenian.

The climate of the city is of the sub-continental type, with cold but not harsh winters (average temperature in January is 3.5 °C) and summers that are not excessively hot, tempered by the proximity of the sea (temperature averages at about 23.5 C in July). The average annual temperature is just below 14 °C. The Ronchi dei Legionari weather station is located in the municipal area, officially recognized by the world meteorological organization.

Air Dolomiti's executive headquarters were formerly in Ronchi dei Legionari, while the airline's registered office was in Dossobuono, Villafranca di Verona.

Twin towns – sister cities

Ronchi dei Legionari is twinned with:
 Metlika, Slovenia
 Wagna, Austria

References

External links

 Official website

Cities and towns in Friuli-Venezia Giulia